Srully Blotnick ( – ) was an American author and journalist.  Notable books include Getting Rich Your Own Way, Computers Made Ridiculously Easy, The Corporate Steeplechase: Predictable Crises in a Business Career, Otherwise Engaged: The Private Lives of Successful Career Women, and Ambitious Men: Their Drives, Dreams and Delusions.

Education 

An expert swimmer, Blotnick first attended the University of Miami, but he later transferred to Rensselaer Polytechnic Institute for math. After receiving his BS degree, he attended the University of California, Berkeley, and then Princeton University, where he received his MA in math and physics, with honors. His interest in mathematical models in sociology took him to Columbia University where a survey was being conducted, funded by the National Science Foundation and he joined a team of researchers. The head of the project died suddenly and the team was left leaderless, unfunded, so Blotnick joined a Wall Street firm for the next 7 years as a research analyst, but his interest in the study continued and he began to write books on the topics. He became a business psychology columnist for Forbes magazine and began writing social science books.

Later life

Srully was admitted as a graduate student to the cell biology program at Harvard Medical School, the oldest graduate student ever accepted, and received his PhD in cell biology in 1994. While there he published several peer-reviewed contributions to the biomedical field, and subsequently was a post-doctoral fellow.

Blotnick died of pulmonary fibrosis in 2004, in Cambridge, Massachusetts.

References

External links 
 Review of Srully Blotnick's books by Harley Hahn.

1941 births
2004 deaths
University of Miami alumni
Rensselaer Polytechnic Institute alumni
University of California, Berkeley alumni
Princeton University alumni
Columbia University staff
Harvard Medical School alumni
20th-century American male writers